Deepsix is a novel by American science fiction author Jack McDevitt.

Plot summary
Priscilla "Hutch" Hutchins leads a crew of space archaeologists to investigate a lost civilization on planet Maleiva III (aka Deepsix) with only a window of weeks before the planet is destroyed by the impending collision with a rogue gas giant.

Reception
Deepsix was a finalist for the John W. Campbell Memorial Award for Best Science Fiction Novel.

References

External links

Novels by Jack McDevitt
American science fiction novels
2000 American novels
2000 science fiction novels